Case Closed: the Fourteenth Target, known as  in Japan, is a Japanese animated feature film based on the Case Closed series. It was released in Japanese theatres on April 18, 1998. The English version was released on DVD on November 20, 2007 by Funimation. The film grossed  in Japan.

Plot 

Rachel has a nightmare of her mother Eva being shot and she calls her up to discuss it. After the phone call, Eva begins questioning herself if her daughter is beginning to remember an incident that left a scar on her upper thigh. Across town, J.T. Morono is released from prison and intends to visit Richard. Dr. Agasa takes the Junior Detective League to a museum. While there, they see Emilio Cantour, a famed photographer, snapping pictures. Mitch quizzes the other members but Conan correctly guesses the right answer. At the Moore agency, Morono leaves after receiving no answer.

Rachel and Serena are attending the book signing of essayist Mason Norfolk. They later visit a cafe where Rachel mentions the fight between her parents which resulted in their separation. Back at the agency, Richard is getting ready for dinner with Eva while Conan notices a TV interview with Christopher Aston, the owner of the newly built AquaCrystal, an entertainment complex situated in the middle of the bay.

While meeting Eva at the restaurant, Richard runs into two of his old friends; Henry Tish, a professional golfer who is training for the US Open, and Kevin Simms, a sommelier. The date goes well until Richard noticed Peter Ford, a newscaster, flirting with his friend, Tammy Diez. He gets jealous, causing Eva to leave abruptly.

A week later, Inspector Meguire, Eva, and Agasa are attacked by a mysterious assailant, leaving behind a cardboard western sword, flower, and ornament respectively at the crime scenes. Conan discovers that the items come from the King, Queen, and Jack playing cards, specifically the suit of spade, which represents death, and that the culprit appears to be targeting victims according to their relation to a card in sequential order and share a connection with Richard. When trying to figure out a possible culprit, Richard mentions J.T. Morono, a shady card dealer who he arrested 10 years prior. Inspector Santos tried to shed light on an incident but Meguire sternly insists on preventing the next attack.

While driving, Conan asks about the incident where Santos reveals that after Morono was finished with questioning, he went to the bathroom, overpowered the escorting guard, took his gun, and attempted to escape; Eva, who brought along a young Rachel and taking Richard a change of clothes, was taken hostage. Richard, then a police officer working under Meguire, drew his gun which led to a brief standoff that ended when he shot his gun, hitting Eva in the thigh. This caught Morono off guard and Richard fired a second time, hitting him in the left shoulder. Richard would go on and resign his position rather facing investigation for his actions. Rachel is distraught after learning the truth and distances herself from Richard.

The next day, Conan remembers that Henry is ranked the 10th best golfer in the world and relays the information to Richard, causing them to tighten security when Henry wants to go flying in his helicopter. During the ride, Henry’s eyes begin to dilate and Conan discovers someone had replaced them with a chemical compound. He swiftly acts and crash lands the helicopter in the Teitan Elementary playground. Everyone makes it out the  helicopter as he explodes, leaving behind card number 10, and Henry is forced to withdraw from the US Open. The investigation team goes to the home of Kevin Simms as he is Number 8 on the list for attending a culinary school with an 8 year program. Kevin explains he has to meet with Christopher Aston about business at his new AquaCrystal resort. Santos realizes that Christopher owns 9 buildings and the team tags along as security.

At AquaCrystal, they meet Nina Oliver, Emilio Cantour, and Peter Ford, however, Christopher is not there. During the monorail ride, they discover that Santos is the youngest of 3 children and their birthdays are spaced three years apart. Emilio has six children, and Peter’s last name has 4 letters. Rachel cringes that Jimmy could be the ace being that he’s number one in many things as well as Japan’s top detective. Once at the restaurant, Nina and Mason get into an argument over Mason’s food recommendations he wrote in his books. Nina challenges him to a blind taste test, which Mason accepts but fails. Kevin tastes the wine and guesses the correct answer, leaving Mason embarrassed. At Christopher’s request via a letter, the group visits the wine cellar where Kevin inadvertently springs a crossbow trap, near the weapon, card number 8. Realizing they are in danger, the group decides to leave but discovers Christopher’s corpse in the fish tank, attached to his body is card number 9.

Richard explains the situation and about T.J. Morono to everyone. Nina, frightened, explains she nearly hit someone riding a motorcycle with her car but sped off without helping the victim. With all emergency exits blocked off with cement, the killer prepares to strike and shuts off the power. Nina, with her nails glowing in the dark, begins to panic and runs right into the killer who stabs her to death. Her body is found along with the 7 of spades and the joker. The juice can Conan had earlier is believed to have been kicked over by the killer as he went after Nina.

Conan investigates Nina’s murder and notices one of her nails broke from her finger, the wine cork she had is missing, and a palm print made by a right handed person on her back. He remembers Morono dealing with his left hand, thus clearing him of any wrongdoing. He finds the slacks of an individual stained with juice and suspects them to be the killer. Conan finds salt in the kitchen and gives everyone water to drink and is positive who the killer is.

Bombs explode at AquaCrystal, trapping everyone inside temporarily. More bombs go off with the spade numbers 6-2 emerging from the water. Everyone manages to swim to the shore with the exception of Rachel. She is saved by Conan and Richard. Mason is left unconscious from the incident and Kevin volunteers to perform CPR, but Conan, through Richard’s voice, forces Santos to do it. Richard, obviously confused, is put to sleep and Conan theorizes that the culprit had a chance encounter with Morono then took advantage of the situation and their past history.

The serial killer is revealed to be Kevin Simms. Most of his victims were merely pawns to disguise his real targets: Nina Oliver, Christopher Aston, Mason Norfolk, and Henry Tish. After murdering Christopher, Kevin set up his own trap in the wine cellar. His motive is that he has taste disorder and is unable to taste food or drink due to trauma or stress. Kevin was seen tasting chili powder, something sommeliers shouldn’t do. He was also given salt water by Conan and didn’t react to it, thus confirming his suspicions. As evidence, the wine cork Nina painted before her death is found in Kevin’s possession. When he attacked her, she turned around and slipped it into his coat pocket without his knowledge. Also inside is the Ace of Spades he intended for Jimmy Kudo.

Kevin confesses and reveals that Nina indeed caused the collision that robbed him of his ability to taste. Christopher buys expensive wine but improperly stores them, a move he finds offensive. Mason poses as a writing expert on fine wine and cuisine, but lacks proper knowledge on the topic. A drunken Henry invited Kevin to a party then belittled him. He came up with the plan after meeting Morono who wanted to apologize for the past incident. Morono was brought over to Kevin’s house and was in fact murdered before the beginning of Kevin’s killing spree. He intended for Mason, his last primary target, to drown below in the sunken restaurant.

Kevin detonates bombs in causing AquaCrystal to slowly sink into the sea and takes Rachel hostage; the investigation team giving chase. AquaCrystal begins crumbling and Kevin intends to escape via helicopter. They confront him at the top of the complex where Santos prepares to shoot but forfeits his gun. When Kevin orders Conan to give him the weapon, Conan finally realizes the truth behind the shooting incident between Richard and Eva. He shoots the gun and the bullet grazes Rachel, leaving Kevin hopeless and without a hostage. Richard charges for Kevin and delivers a powerful Judo throw that slams the serial killer to the ground. Kevin slips over the ledge wanting to die in the sea but Richard saves him, intending for him to answer for his crimes in a federal prison for the rest of his life. They save Rachel, who also understands Richard's actions during her mother's hostage incident; the bullet was intended for Eva so Morono would have no use for a wounded hostage. She clutches onto Richard and they escape from AquaCrystal as it finally collapses into the sea while the others are saved by the coast guard. Kevin is arrested.

Sometime later, after the end credits, Eva reveals the real reason she left Richard. After her hostage incident, she made dinner for Richard as thanks. He instead insulted the food, enraging Eva and ultimately causing the separation due to him being ungrateful. Conan and Rachel both agree that Eva’s cooking isn’t the best as the film officially ends.

Playing card symbols 

During the course of the film multiple characters are represented by a certain number from a standard deck of cards. The playing cards are all spades, which represents death.  The victim's name, clue left behind, and the connection with the number are all displayed below in the chart.  Since the English adaptation has changed names of the characters, the corresponding relationships between the character and the numbers were changed accordingly.

Inspiration 
The plot of the film is a combination of two Agatha Christie mystery novels. The A.B.C. Murders is an Hercule Poirot mystery where the murderer seems to be picking victims based on the alphabet, just as people are being targeted in this film based on numbers in their names. It contains the same revelations that the murderer is only establishing a pattern to confuse detectives, and is willing to kill victims unrelated to his true motives in order to maintain the ruse. The other novel is And Then There Were None, where various people are invited to a secluded island and killed one by one, with the murderer actually being one of the party. In a nod and possible clue to viewers, Conan mentions a type of wine that Poirot drank in Death on the Nile.

Cast

Production

Theme Song 

Lyrics by: Izumi Sakai / Music by: Aika Ohno / Arranged by: Daisuke Ikeda / Performed by: Zard

Soundtrack 
Masayoshi Takanaka (lead guitar), Ken Yoshida (bass), and Nobu Saito (percussion) are in charge of the performance of "Detective Conan Main Theme (Target Version)". In addition, T-SQUARE's Takeshi Ito ("Conan passes", "Aqua Crystal", "Into Aqua Crystal", "Frustration"), Casiopea's Tetsuo Sakurai ("Aqua Crystal", "Into Aqua Crystal"), George Yanagi ("KIZUNA (vocal version)") is participating.

Box office 

Home media

VHS 
The VHS of the film was released on April 14, 1999. It was discontinued soon after 2006 as it was switched to DVD.

Region 2 DVD 
The DVD of the film was released on March 28, 2001. A new DVD was released on February 25, 2011, significantly lowering the original price and added the trailer as a special feature.

Region 1 DVD 
Funimation's English dub of The Fourteenth Target was released on November 20, 2007. Due to the Americanization of the majority of the character's names, most of the explanations for names have been changed. The ending of this film as well was changed to an endless loop of police cars with their lights from the final scene with the credits displayed over it.

Blu-ray 
The Blu-ray version of the film was released on June 24, 2011. The Blu-ray contains the same content of the DVD plus a mini-booklet explaining the film and the BD-live function.

Reception 
Anime News Network's Carlo Santos gave a mixed review of the film, saying that while it makes for "a good action-suspense movie with a clever mystery setup", he found fault in the dub transition of the story and ended saying: "In short, it's one of those movies that just happens to be a really long TV episode."

References

External links 
 
 

Fourteenth Target
Films directed by Kenji Kodama
1998 anime films
Funimation
Films set in Tokyo
TMS Entertainment
Toho animated films
Works about fictional serial killers